"Are You Mine" is a song written by Don Grashey, James Amadeo, and Myrna Lorrie, performed by Ginny Wright and Tom Tall, and released on the Fabor label (catalog no. 117). In October 1955, it peaked at No. 2 on Billboards country and western disk jockey chart. It spent 26 weeks on the charts and was also ranked No. 14 on Billboards 1955 year-end country and western juke box chart and No. 17 on the year-end retail chart.

See also
 Billboard Top Country & Western Records of 1955

References

American country music songs
1955 songs